Tonga National Paralympic Committee (IPC code: TGA) is the National Paralympic Committee representing Tonga.

References

Tonga
Tonga at the Paralympics
Paralympic
Disability organisations based in Tonga